Johan Wilhelm "Jaska" Saarivuori (3 November 1888 – 1 August 1938) was a Finnish gymnast who competed at the 1908 Summer Olympics.

He finnicized his family name from Öhberg to Saarivuori in 1906.

Sources

References

1888 births
1938 deaths
Finnish male artistic gymnasts
Olympic gymnasts of Finland
Gymnasts at the 1908 Summer Olympics
People from Viipuri Province (Grand Duchy of Finland)
20th-century Finnish people